Aguada Coliseum is an arena in Aguada, Puerto Rico.  It hosted some of the judo and wrestling events for the 2010 Central American and Caribbean Games.

References 

2010 Central American and Caribbean Games venues
Aguada, Puerto Rico